Melvin Jermaine Hardy (born March 20, 1982) is a former American football defensive back for the NFL's Carolina Panthers.

References

1982 births
Living people
Sportspeople from Roanoke, Virginia
Virginia Cavaliers football players
Arizona Cardinals players
San Francisco 49ers players
Carolina Panthers players
Rhein Fire players